The 2021 Liga 2 Final was the final match of the 2021–22 Liga 2, the 12th season of second-tier competition in Indonesia organised by PT Liga Indonesia Baru, and the fourth season since it was renamed from the Liga Indonesia Premier Division to the Liga 2. It was played at the Pakansari Stadium in Cibinong, Bogor, West Java on 30 December 2021.

Persis won the match 2–1 to secure their first title in this competition.

Road to the final

Note: In all results below, the score of the finalist is given first (H: home; A: away).

Match
Times listed below are UTC+7.

Details

References

Liga 2
2021